The PFL 4 mixed martial arts event for the 2019 season of the Professional Fighters League was held on July 11, 2019, at the Ocean Resort Casino in Atlantic City, New Jersey. This was the fourth regular season event of 2019 and include fights in the welterweight and women's lightweight divisions.

Background
The day before the event a Women's Lightweight bout between Sarah Kaufman and Roberta Samad and a Welterweight bout between André Fialho and Zane Kamaka were both cancelled as Samad and Kamaka both missed weight for their respective bouts.

Results

Standings After Event
The PFL points system is based on results of the match.  The winner of a fight receives 3 points.  If the fight ends in a draw, both fighters will receive 1 point. The bonus for winning a fight in the first, second, or third round is 3 points, 2 points, and 1 point respectively. The bonus for winning in the third round requires a fight be stopped before 4:59 of the third round.  No bonus point will be awarded if a fighter wins via decision.  For example, if a fighter wins a fight in the first round, then the fighter will receive 6 total points. A decision win will result in three total points.  If a fighter misses weight, the opponent (should they comply with weight limits) will receive 3 points due to a walkover victory, regardless of winning or losing the bout;  if the non-offending fighter subsequently wins with a stoppage, all bonus points will be awarded.

Welterweight

Women's Lightweight

♛ = Clinched playoff spot ---
E = Eliminated

See also
List of PFL events
List of current PFL fighters

References

Professional Fighters League
2019 in mixed martial arts
Sports in Atlantic City, New Jersey
Mixed martial arts in New Jersey
2019 in sports in New Jersey
July 2019 sports events in the United States
Events in Atlantic City, New Jersey